Androrangavola is a rural municipality in Madagascar. It belongs to the district of Ifanadiana, which is a part of Vatovavy. The population of this municipality was 14,709 inhabitants in 2018.

Primary and junior level secondary education are available in town. The majority 99.5% of the population of the commune are farmers.  The most important crops are coffee and rice, while other important agricultural products are lychee and cassava. Services provide employment for 0.5% of the population.

Androrangavola is situated on the Namorona River.

References

Populated places in Vatovavy